Magha (māgha, माघ or maghā, मघा) may refer to:

 Magha (month) (māgha, माघ), a month in the Hindu calendar
 Magh (Bengali calendar), the same month in the Bengali calendar
 Magha (poet) (māgha, माघ), an 8th-century Sanskrit poet, who wrote Shishupala-vadha 
 Magha (nakshatra) (maghā, मघा), a nakshatra (star or division of the sky) in Indian astronomy or astrology
 Magha Puja (Māgha Pūjā), a Southeast Asian Buddhist festival 
 Kalinga Magha a king of Sri Lanka

See also
 Maga (disambiguation)
 Maghar (disambiguation)
 Megha (disambiguation)